Oleh Stanislavovich Patyak (born 28 November 1985) is a Ukrainian former footballer.

External links
 

1985 births
Living people
Ukrainian footballers
Ukrainian expatriate footballers
FC Metalurh Zaporizhzhia players
PFC Spartak Nalchik players
Expatriate footballers in Russia
Russian Premier League players
Association football midfielders